Northern Province was an electorate of the Victorian Legislative Council (Australia),

It was initially created by the Legislative Council Act 1881 (taking effect at the 1882 elections) and defined  as having the following divisions: Echuca Shire, Echuca Borough, Marong, Raywood, Huntly, Waranga, Sandhurst (North), Sandhurst Central, Sandhurst South and Eaglehawk. Northern Province was created out of parts of North Western Province (which was resized) and Eastern Province, which was abolished.

1904
Northern Province was redefined in the Electoral Provinces Boundaries Act 1903 and consisted of the following: 

Northern Province and North Central provinces were split off from North Western in 1882.

Northern Province was abolished on 4 May 1979.

Members for Northern Province
Three members were elected to the province initially; four from the expansion of the Council in 1889; 
two from the redistribution of 1904 when several new provinces including Bendigo and Melbourne North were created.

Election results

|- style="background-color:#E9E9E9"
! colspan="6" style="text-align:left;" |After distribution of preferences

References

Former electoral provinces of Victoria (Australia)
1882 establishments in Australia
1979 disestablishments in Australia